Arthurtown is an unincorporated community and census-designated place (CDP) in Richland County, South Carolina, United States. It was listed appeared as a CDP prior to the 2020 census. Its population in 2020 was 2,294.

Geography
The CDP is in western Richland County, bordered to the north, east, and west by the city of Columbia, the state capital, and to the south by the city of Cayce. South Carolina Highway 48 (Bluff Road) is the main road through Arthurtown, leading northwest  to downtown Columbia and southeast  to Gadsden. Interstate 77 passes just south of Arthurtown, with access from Exit 5 at SC 48.

Demographics

2020 census

Note: the US Census treats Hispanic/Latino as an ethnic category. This table excludes Latinos from the racial categories and assigns them to a separate category. Hispanics/Latinos can be of any race.

References 

Census-designated places in Richland County, South Carolina
Census-designated places in South Carolina